The 1991 430 km of Monza was the second round of the 1991 World Sportscar Championship season, taking place at Autodromo Nazionale Monza, Italy.  It took place on May 5, 1991.

Official results
Class winners in bold.  Cars failing to complete 90% of the winner's distance marked as Not Classified (NC).

Statistics
 Pole Position - Teo Fabi (#4 Silk Cut Jaguar) - 1:33.672
 Fastest Lap - Martin Brundle (#4 Silk Cut Jaguar) - 1:29.182
 Average Speed - 207.614 km/h

External links
 WSPR-Racing - 1991 Monza results

Monza
6 Hours of Monza
Monza